, formerly  and previously spelled in English as VisualArt's, is a Japanese publishing company which specializes in publishing and distributing visual novels for a large list of game developers. Visual Arts has developed game engines their brands currently use, including the current engine, called Siglus, and older engines RealLive and AVG32. Visual Arts also handles the distribution of these games. The games published are mostly for a male audience, though they also publish games targeted towards women as well. They are well known for publishing games developed by Key, such as Kanon, Air, and Clannad.

The company has coined a new type of visual novel called the kinetic novel where unlike in visual novels where the player is periodically given choices to make, there are no choices whatsoever and the player watches the game progress as if it were a movie. One of Key's games entitled Planetarian: The Reverie of a Little Planet was the first game produced under the kinetic novel name. In addition to games, Visual Arts also releases music CDs for video game music. Of special note among the artists sold under this label is I've Sound, a techno/trance music production group who was the first in the adult game industry to perform at the Nippon Budokan in October 2005.

Visual Arts is also involved with transplanting games they have previously published to be playable on mobile phones. Visual Arts launched a web magazine called Visualstyle on October 26, 2007. Visual Arts launched a YouTube channel called Visual Channel in July 2008 where videos are posted which are related to the games and companies under Visual Arts. In October 2008, Visual Arts launched their VA Bunko light novel imprint, which includes light novels based on games produced by brands under Visual Arts.

Partner companies

Game brands

13 cm
Amedeo
Anfini
B_Works
Bonbee!
Catwalk
Concept
Dress
E.G.O.
Elysion
Flady
Frill
Garden
G-clef
Ham Ham Soft
Hadashi Shōjo
Hayashigumi
Image Craft
Issue
Jidaiya
Key
KineticNovel
Kur-Mar-Ter
KuroCo
Lapis Lazuli
LimeLight
Mana
Miss Chifu
Moe.
Ningyou Yuugisya
Ocelot
OPTiM
Pass Guard
Pekoe
Playm
Radi
Realdeal
Rex
Rio
Saga Planets
Sirius
Spray
Studio Mebius
Tone Work's
Zero
Zion

Music related
Cure Records
fripSide
I've Sound
Key Sounds Label
OTSU
Queens Label

Defunct

Akiko
Akumi
Craftwork
Culotte
D-XX
Giant Panda
Harvest
Kamen Shōkai
Manbō Soft
Miyabi
Otherwise
Ram
Tamachadō
Words

References

External links
 
Visual Arts product website 
Visual Arts Motto official website 
Visual Channel at YouTube 
VA Bunko official website 

Japanese companies established in 1991
Video game companies established in 1991
Amusement companies of Japan
Video game development companies
Video game companies of Japan
Key (company)
Book publishing companies of Japan